Dom otdykha is a rural locality (a settlement) in Kalachyovskoye Rural Settlement, Kalachyovsky District, Volgograd Oblast, Russia. The population was 109 as of 2010.

Geography 
Dom otdykha is located 41 km southeast of Kalach-na-Donu (the district's administrative centre) by road. Kolpachki is the nearest rural locality.

References 

Rural localities in Kalachyovsky District